is a Japanese composer. From 2001 to 2005 he was a member of the J-pop duo Breath.

He has been one of the main song composers for Ayumi Hamasaki and has also written songs for Kumi Koda, Every Little Thing, Ami Suzuki and others. He won the Best Composer Award at the Japan Record Awards in 2001 for the single Fragile by Every Little Thing. Currently he is the designated composer for the Chinese singer alan.

External links
Official Blog (Japanese)
Official Website (Japanese)

1977 births
Japanese composers
Japanese male composers
Living people